Baragama is a village in Hindaun Tehsil, Karauli district, Rajasthan, India, and forms a part of Bharatpur Division.

Demographics
Hindi is the local language.

Transport
Nearby rail stations are Sikroda Mina Railway Station, Shri Mahahaveer Ji Railway Station, and Hindaun City Railway Station. The nearest major station is  distant at Alwar.

Nearby bus stands are those at Hindaun and Banwaripur.

Temples
Baragama has three temples:
Shri Nahar Singh & Pathan Baba
Hunuman Ji Ka
Jain Sthanak

References

.

Villages in Karauli district